In Love is singer Cheryl Lynn's second studio album on Columbia Records in 1979.

Track listing
"I've Got Faith in You" - (Bobby Caldwell)  4:46
"Hide It Away" - (Greg Phillinganes, Michael Sembello, Nathan Watts, Raymond Pounds)  4:38
"Feel It" - (Brian Becvar)  5:09
"In Love" - (David Cohen, Leslie Ruchala)  5:56
"Keep It Hot" - (Cheryl Lynn, George Bryant)  5:24
"I've Got Just What You Need" - (John Footman, Judy Weider)  3:52
"Love Bomb" - (Barry Blue, Lynsey de Paul)  4:12
"Chances" - (Cheryl Lynn)  4:10
"Don't Let It Fade Away" - (Rod Bowkett)  5:12

 Bonus Tracks (2013 UK Funkytown Grooves Re-issue)
10. "In Love" (single edit)  3:45

11. "Keep It Hot" (Special 12" Club Mix)  5:27

12. "Feel It" (single edit)  3:58

Personnel
Cheryl Lynn - lead and backing vocals
Bobby Caldwell, Cornell Dupree, Paul Jackson Jr., Jeff Lee, Michael McGlory - guitar
Greg Phillinganes, David Foster, Paul Griffin, Richard Tee, Brian Becvar, Jean Roussel, John Footman, John Cameron - keyboards
Bernard Purdie, Andy Newmark, James Gadson - Drums
Chuck Rainey, David Shields - bass guitar
Michael Brecker - saxophone
Bobbye Hall - congas
Delbert Langston, Sharon Jack - backing vocals

Charts

Singles

References

External links
 Cheryl Lynn-In Love at Discogs

1979 albums
Cheryl Lynn albums
Columbia Records albums